"Through the Fire" is a song recorded by Chaka Khan from her sixth studio album, I Feel for You (1984). The David Foster-produced track was the third single from the album and reached number 60 on the US Billboard Hot 100 chart and number 15 on the Hot R&B/Hip-Hop Songs charts. It was one of the few Khan hits to cross to the Adult Contemporary chart.

Foster revealed in his 2011 PBS concert The Hit Man Returns that this was the only melody that he ever wrote with someone in mind and that the working title of the piece was actually called "Chaka" because he was very confident that Khan would perform the song.

Legacy
The song was covered by Peabo Bryson in his 1994 album.

It was sampled by Kanye West on "Through the Wire", the breakout single from his 2004 debut album, The College Dropout.

In 2010, Japanese-American singer Ai covered "Through the Fire" on her studio album The Last Ai with Khan. Alongside another song Khan was featured on, "One More Try", the duo were nominated for and won the International Collaboration Artists of the Year award at the 2010 Billboard Japan Music Awards for the two songs.

Gospel artist Donald Lawrence included a cover of the song, performed by Tobbi White-Darks and Tommi White, on his album YRM (Your Righteous Mind) (2011).

Music video
The video, which was filmed in Los Angeles' Union Station, featured Khan singing while walking aimlessly among several romantically involved couples.

Chart history

References

Chaka Khan songs
Nina Girado songs
La India songs
Ai (singer) songs
1984 songs
Songs written by David Foster
Songs with lyrics by Cynthia Weil
Song recordings produced by David Foster
Contemporary R&B ballads
1984 singles
1985 singles
Warner Records singles
Songs written by Tom Keane (musician)
1980s ballads